Nathaniel Colburn (1611–1691) was an early settler and selectman in Dedham, Massachusetts.

Early life
He was baptized in 1611 in Woolverstone, Suffolk, England. His parents were Leonard Colborne and Sara (née Lewes) and he had a sister named Sarah. In 1630, Governor John Winthrop organized a group of men to move to New England and Colburn joined the group.

Dedham

Colburn arrived in Dedham shortly after it was incorporated in 1636. Colburn married Priscilla Clarke on July 25, 1639, and together they had 11 children. He signed the Dedham Covenant and was an original proprietor. In addition to being selectman for five years, he held a number of roles and positions of responsibility within the new town including tithingman. He had 11 children, the youngest of whom was Joseph.

Colburn was admitted to the First Church and Parish in Dedham on January 29, 1641, "after long and much inquisition into his case," nearly a year after his wife was. They lived nearby, on the west side of what is today Wigwam Creek. Part of Mother Brook ran through his land. He owned considerable property.

Ten years after King Phillip's War, question arose as to whether or not the town of Wrentham, Massachusetts was on land legally purchased from the Wampanoag people. In March 1667, Colburn testified that he personally witnessed Metacomet sign the deed to the lands.

Death and legacy

Colburn died May 14, 1691. He was an ancestor of Waldo Colburn.

References

Works cited

External links

People from colonial Dedham, Massachusetts
Dedham, Massachusetts selectmen
People from Woolverstone
1611 births
1691 deaths
Kingdom of England emigrants to Massachusetts Bay Colony
Signers of the Dedham Covenant
Diplomats from Dedham, Massachusetts